Muppet*Vision 3D is a 3D film attraction located at Disney's Hollywood Studios. The attraction also formerly operated at Disney California Adventure. Directed by Jim Henson, the attraction consists of a pre-show which then leads into Kermit the Frog guiding park guests on a tour through Muppet Studios, while the Muppets prepare their sketch acts to demonstrate their new breakthrough in 3D film technology. The show, however, completely unravels when Dr. Bunsen Honeydew's experimental 3D sprite, Waldo, causes mayhem during the next portion of the show.

The attraction—which opened as Jim Henson's Muppet*Vision 3D on May 16, 1991 at Disney's Hollywood Studios (then Disney-MGM Studios)—incorporates the 3D film in conjunction with in-theater 4D effects, such as Audio-Animatronics, lighting, projections, smoke, soap bubbles, and a live full-bodied performer. Muppet*Vision 3D had a subsequent incarnation which opened in Disney California Adventure on February 8, 2001 and operated at the park until November 1, 2014.

Muppet*Vision 3D is the sole attraction of Grand Avenue in Disney's Hollywood Studios.

History
The show is a 3D film featuring Jim Henson's Muppets. Due to the use of Audio-Animatronics, a live full-bodied Muppet and other similar effects, the show is sometimes referred to as "Muppet*Vision 4D" (which was used in The Walt Disney World Explorer application, displayed as "Jim Henson's Muppet*Vision 3D 4D" with a slanted red strikethrough on "3D"). It was filmed in Soundstage 3 at the Walt Disney Studios in January 1990 and directed by Jim Henson and written by Bill Prady. The show was one of the final Muppets projects with the involvement of Henson, as well as veteran Muppet performer Richard Hunt, and was the last time they performed their characters. Henson died in 1990, before production of the film was completed, and Hunt died in 1992.

On August 28, 1989, Disney announced that they had an "agreement in principle" to acquire Henson Associates and the Muppet characters, and that a 3D Muppets attraction would debut at Disney-MGM Studios (now Disney's Hollywood Studios) the following May. Jim Henson died before the attraction could debut, and as a result the acquisition was cancelled and the attraction, now known as Muppet*Vision 3D, was delayed. An agreement to license the Muppets characters for the theme park attraction was reached, and it officially opened on May 16, 1991, the first anniversary of Jim Henson's death.

On February 8, 2001, Muppet*Vision 3D debuted as an opening day attraction at Disney California Adventure.

The attraction was once sponsored by Kodak upon opening in 1991. However, in 2012, the company declined to renew sponsorship and by 2013, all references to Kodak were removed.

Throughout the attraction's operation at Disney California Adventure, the theater was used to present sneak peeks of Tron: Legacy, Frankenweenie, and Oz the Great and Powerful. On January 7, 2015, the theater at Disney California Adventure began operating as the Crown Jewel Theatre and presented For the First Time in Forever: A Frozen Sing-Along Celebration, a musical stage show based on Frozen. The attraction operated until April 17, 2016. The location was renamed to the Sunset Showcase Theater and began showing Walt Disney Pictures film previews in May 2016. In April 2019, the Sunset Showcase Theater began showing Mickey's PhilharMagic.

The California Adventure location closed on November 1, 2014, in what was originally supposed to be a temporary closure, but in May 2015, Disney confirmed that the attraction's closure was permanent.

For the 2017 season, the Hollywood Studios location received a new entrance. The original Kermit marquee was removed and it was replaced with a new Broadway-style sign, and the name of the theater was changed to "Grand Arts Theater". In 2019, the original mural with Kermit and Miss Piggy was removed, and the exterior was repainted to match the rest of the area's color scheme.

Attraction

Queue 

Before guests are seated in the theater where the film is shown, they go through the queue, which winds through "Muppet Labs", home of Dr. Bunsen Honeydew and his assistant Beaker. The audience passes several office doors, all featuring outlandish job descriptions and spoof movie posters featuring the Muppets, including The Bride of Froggen-Schwein, The Pigseidon Adventure, and SuperBeaker II. Guests then enter a large room filled with Muppet "props" and boxes with comical and humorous labels. Above guests' heads are sets of three television monitors, where the pre-show featuring several Muppets is shown.

The audience is repeatedly reminded to take a pair of 3D glasses from several containers around the room before entering the theater, which is modeled after the theater depicted on The Muppet Show. Muppet*Vision 3D is the only Disney 3D attraction currently playing which refers to the glasses as "3D Glasses". However, the glasses are sometimes referred to as "3D Safety Goggles", foreshadowing the "dangerous" experiments guests will be visiting.

At Disney California Adventure, the queue was different in that it featured a cast member at the turnstile handing out the glasses individually and the "hallway" scene from the Disney's Hollywood Studios queue was replaced with a "courtyard" filled with various props. The queue winded around a fake "set", blending in with the rest of the Hollywood Land district.  Guests also saw half of a motorbike protruding from the wall above, with a hole in the shape of Gonzo. The pre-show room there included a scrolling LED monitor known as The Official Time Clock which displayed various messages and jokes (including references to Elvis and The Mickey Mouse Club) while counting down to showtime.

In the spring of 2008, the queue was replaced with an eating area for the nearby Award Weiners restaurant in order to provide more seating for it. The spoof movie posters were removed, now in their place are real movie posters promoting current and upcoming films from Walt Disney Studios as well as posters promoting Disney+ shows. The original "Disaster Effects" storage area remained until January 2015.

From March 2014 to December 2016, the pre-show was edited to include Constantine, the villain from Muppets Most Wanted (2014), to promote the new film. Likewise, in October 2021, the majority of the pre-show was replaced with a promo Hosted by Pepe the King Prawn, for Muppets Haunted Mansion (2021).

Pre-show

Inside the prop warehouse, guests watch a film that shows the Muppets preparing for the upcoming show. The pre-show begins with a construction crew attempting to hang a series of Kodak signs (after Kodak left the sponsorship, the signs were also turned into MuppetVision 3D title cards) and a MuppetVision 3D title card, with comical results. The preparations for the show are being supervised by Scooter, who first has to deal with a series of technical difficulties. As Scooter attempts to get the show in order, he is constantly interrupted by the cast. Fozzie Bear is the first to interrupt, as while it initially appears that he is trying to get the penguins ready in the orchestra, it eventually becomes clear that he is also  trying to present his new musical act, The Three Ds. The group then performs a disastrous version of "By the Light of the Silvery Moon". Bean Bunny is prepping for Miss Piggy’s musical number. Ignoring Scooter's warnings not to interrupt her, Bean is eventually karate chopped across the room by her. Next, Gonzo takes center stage in the film when he sends Scooter away to answer the telephone (despite the fact that Muppets do not have one). Gonzo then tries to tap dance with a vase of flowers on his head. After Bean once again attempts to help Miss Piggy, Sam Eagle gives guests a safety spiel. Gonzo then tells Sam that Mickey Mouse is in the building. An excited Sam introduces Mickey, only to see that it is just Rizzo the Rat wearing Mickey Mouse ears. Sam then tells guests to move all the way down the rows in the theater. Finally, a stampede of Muppets run over Sam and enter the theater and guests follow them in.

Main Show

The show commences with Statler and Waldorf in their usual box putting on the glasses, and heckling the audience. A penguin orchestra rises up. They tune and play a fanfare, which leads into the opening. Gonzo appears behind a door and pushes a stick labeled "3D" towards the audience. Kermit the Frog appears and welcomes the audience to Muppet*Vision 3D. He then gives the audience a tour of Muppet Studios, where many of the Muppets are preparing for segments in the show to follow the tour. Many 3D effects are performed at this point. Kermit then informs guests that the Swedish Chef is in charge of the projector. He also introduces the upcoming acts including a song by Miss Piggy, and musical finale by Sam. As this point, Kermit is interrupted by Fozzie, who performs a series of "cheap 3D tricks." This includes a noisemaker, a can of springs, and a flower that sprays water. Statler and Waldorf heckle Fozzie, telling him that his act is not funny even in 3D.

Kermit then takes the audience to a top secret laboratory. He then introduces Dr. Bunsen Honeydew and his assistant, Beaker. However, Bunsen and Beaker are unable to control their newest invention; a living 3D effect called Waldo C. Graphic, (who first appeared on The Jim Henson Hour in 1989) Waldo proves to be uncontrollable and wreaks havoc in the lab. Bunsen tells Beaker to use the lab's inflatomatic to deactivate Waldo. He does so, but instead of being deactivated, Waldo explodes into smaller versions of himself. Bunsen then tells Beaker to use the lab's vacuum cleaner to suck up all the Waldos, but also accidentally sucks up the entire lab. All but one Waldo is sucked up and realizing he is free, shape shifts into a taxi cab and drives away.

Kermit then reappears. Fozzie returns and attempts to demonstrate his flying pie but it malfunctions and hits him in the face. Kermit then introduces Miss Piggy's musical rendition of "Dream a Little Dream of Me". Bean attempts to assist Miss Piggy by using various props to add 3D effects. These include bubbles blown from a bubble maker. To add the realism, real soap bubbles are blown from the ceiling of the theater. Miss Piggy gets annoyed and Bean then gives her a rope, explaining that it is for the water skiing finale. A boat pulls Miss Piggy into the pond and out of the scene. A frustrated Sam sends Bean away. Bean then meets Waldo and together, they leave the film. Gonzo sees Bean and Waldo leaving and goes to find Kermit. Gonzo gathers Kermit and Fozzie to help him look for Bean. Sweetums (who is a live full-bodied Muppet) comes out into the audience to search for him having already done so on screen. With help from the audience, he finds Bean on the other side balcony, across from Statler and Waldorf. He explains why he ran away and agrees to stay if he can help in the finale. Kermit, Fozzie, and Gonzo decide to let Bean shoot off the fireworks.

Kermit then introduces the finale with a toy soldier marching band playing patriotic music. During their performance, Waldo bounces on their heads and one of the tuba players gets his head stuck inside. Since he cannot see, he runs into people and causes them to fall down. Sam then tells Bean to shoot off the fireworks. To show off, Waldo shape shifts into a rocket and zooms around Miss Piggy, who is dressed like the Statue of Liberty, and accidentally tears off her skirt. Waldo then plummets into the penguin orchestra, causing smoke to rise. Sweetums reappears and tells Chef to stop the projector. He then puts out the fire with water, which infuriates the penguins and they decide to retaliate with a cannon. After Sweetums tells the audience to duck, the penguins fire their cannon and hit the projector.

Chef then tries to destroy Waldo, who he believes destroyed the film and is now all alone on a blank screen, by firing a gun at him. After missing several times, Chef decides to use a cannon. This causes an explosion as the theater blows up, tearing a hole in the screen, as well as "revealing" some bricks and sheetrock throughout the main theater, and revealing what is on the "other side" of the screen: guests at a Disney Park. Statler and Waldorf (now hiding in their box), hold up white flags in surrender. Kermit then appears on the back of a fire engine through the hole to apologize for the chaos. He then bids the audience farewell and the curtains close. Waldo appears one last time and shape shifts into Mickey Mouse so that nobody would recognize him. However, he shape shifts back to his true form as a vacuum sucks him up. Bean comments on what a cute ending the show was as the curtains on his balcony close. Statler asks Waldorf what he thought of the show. He asks Statler if they have time to go to the bathroom before the next shows starts. He replies that they cannot, because "We're bolted to the seats." Then the curtains on their balcony close, concluding the show and a cast member thanks the audience for coming, while reminding them to return their 3D glasses into the bins outside of the theater.

Aside from the Muppets on-screen, there are also a number of in-theater Muppets, mostly audio-animatronic, that interact with the show. Statler and Waldorf heckle from a balcony near the screen, an orchestra of penguins rises into sight to perform, and the Swedish Chef "operates" the film projector from the booth above and behind the audience.

Cast
 Jim Henson as Kermit the Frog, Waldorf and The Swedish Chef
 Frank Oz as Miss Piggy, Fozzie Bear, Sam Eagle and Boss (Construction Worker)
 Dave Goelz as Gonzo, Dr. Bunsen Honeydew, Zoot, Rick and Dinah
 Richard Hunt as Scooter, Statler, Beaker, Sweetums, Chuck and Chicken
 Steve Whitmire as Waldo C. Graphic, Bean Bunny and Rizzo the Rat
 Jerry Nelson as Camilla the Chicken
 John Henson as Sweetums (on-screen only)
 David Rudman as Roy and Max
Kathryn Mullen as Dorothy
 Wayne Allwine as Waldo's impersonation of Mickey Mouse

Additional performers include; Kevin Carlson, Rick Lyon, Allan Trautman, Rickey Boyd, Bruce Lanoil, Terri Hardin, Steven Ritz-Barr, Len Levitt, and Mark Bryan Wilson.

Gallery

See also
 List of 3D films
 List of amusement rides based on television franchises
 The Muppets Present: Great Moments in American History

Notes

References

External links
 Official Disney's Hollywood Studios website
 

Amusement rides introduced in 1991
Amusement rides introduced in 2001
Walt Disney Parks and Resorts attractions
Disney California Adventure
Disney's Hollywood Studios
The Muppets films
1991 short films
1991 films
1990s 3D films
Walt Disney Parks and Resorts films
Hollywood Land
Streets of America
Short films directed by Jim Henson
Audio-Animatronic attractions
Amusement rides based on television franchises
3D short films
4D films
Grand Avenue (Disney)
1991 establishments in Florida
2001 establishments in California
2014 disestablishments in California